Gartly railway station served the hamlet of Gartly, Aberdeenshire, Scotland from 1854 to 1968 on the Great North of Scotland Railway.

History 
The station opened on 20 September 1854 by the Great North of Scotland Railway. It was also known as Gartly for Lumsden and Strathdon station. It closed to both passengers and goods traffic on 6 May 1968.

The station building is now a private residence.

References

External links 

Disused railway stations in Aberdeenshire
Former Great North of Scotland Railway stations
Railway stations in Great Britain opened in 1854
Railway stations in Great Britain closed in 1968
1854 establishments in Scotland
1968 disestablishments in Scotland
Beeching closures in Scotland